South West Queensland Thunder is a semi-professional soccer club based Toowoomba, and represents the South West Queensland Region in the National Premier Leagues Queensland and Football Queensland Premier League. The club was established in 2012, and play their home fixtures at Clive Berghofer Stadium.

The club fields teams in National Premier Leagues Queensland, Football Queensland Premier League (FQPL) and NPLW age groups, as well as Skills Acquisition Program Academies for boys and girls.

Home ground
Clive Berghofer Stadium is a rectangular football stadium in Toowoomba, Queensland. Situated on Mary Street on the eastern fringes of Toowoomba CBD adjacent to Queens Park and Toowoomba East State School.
Formerly known as Athletic Oval, the stadium was renamed to reflect the home club's major sponsor, philanthropist property developer and former local Mayor Clive Berghofer. The ground plays host to rugby league, rugby union and football fixtures and is lit to A-League standard. The recently upgraded grandstand includes undercover seating for 2,300. The stadium has hosted international and national rugby league matches as well pre-season A-League fixtures.

Current Senior Men's Squad

Current Senior Women's Squad

Football Staff
 Manager Football Operations: Janelle Sothmann
 Technical Director: Ivor Prasad
 Senior Men's Head Coach: Sam Gahan
 Senior Women's Head Coach: Tim Taylor

References

External links
 Official website
 Football Queensland Premier Leagues Website

Soccer clubs in Queensland
National Premier Leagues clubs
Association football clubs established in 2012
2012 establishments in Australia
Sport in Toowoomba